Cover is a 2009 album of cover versions by Joan As Police Woman. The limited edition physical CD version of the album was sold through Joan's official website and at her live shows. The cover picture refers to the cover of the 1973 album Everything I Do Gonna Be Funky by the jazz-funk guitarist O'Donel Levy.

Track listing

2009 albums
Joan as Police Woman albums
Covers albums